The following is a list of Irish-American soldiers, sailors, airmen and Marines who were awarded the American military's highest decoration — the Medal of Honor. The Medal of Honor is bestowed "for conspicuous gallantry and intrepidity at the risk of life, above and beyond the call of duty, in actual combat against an armed enemy force." The medal is awarded by the President of the United States on behalf of the Congress.

Of the 3,464 Medals of Honor awarded as of September 17, 2009, an estimated 2,021 (58%) have been awarded to Irish-American recipients, more than twice the number awarded any other ethnic group; 257 Irish-born Americans have received the Medal of Honor which represents more than half of foreign-born MOH recipients. A monument to these Irish-born Medal of Honor recipients is located at Valley Forge's Medal of Honor Grove; erected by the Ancient Order of Hibernians. The first Irish American to receive the Medal was Michael Madden, who received it for his actions in the American Civil War (Note that the earliest action for which the Medal of Honor was awarded was to Irish American  U.S. Army Assistant Surgeon Bernard J.D. Irwin for the engagement at Apache Pass, February 1861.  The award was made three decades after the event and after Madden's award).

Medal of Honor

The Medal of Honor was created during the American Civil War and is the highest military decoration presented by the United States government to a member of its armed forces. The recipient must have distinguished themselves at the risk of their own life above and beyond the call of duty in action against an enemy of the United States. Due to the nature of this medal, it is commonly presented posthumously.

Civil War

Indian Wars

Korean Expedition

Spanish–American War

Philippine-American War

Boxer Rebellion

United States occupation of Haiti

World War I

World War II

Korean War

Vietnam War

War in Afghanistan

War in Iraq

Peacetime

See also
 List of Medal of Honor recipients

References

Further reading
 Griffin, William D. The Book of Irish Americans. New York: Times Books, 1990. 
 O'Donnell, Edward T. 1001 Things Everyone Should Know About Irish-American History. New York: Broadway Books, 2002.

External links
 
 Medal of Honor Recipients (Irish Born)

 Medal of Honor recipients
Medal of Honor recipients
Lists of Medal of Honor recipients